Entzheim is a commune, in the Bas-Rhin department in Grand Est in north-eastern France.

Strasbourg Airport is located in the commune.

Climate 
The climate is oceanic (Köppen: Cfb), more extreme than most other French cities. The data is from the airport that serves Strasbourg and is therefore used as the base for the same city in terms of climate.

Education
The commune has a preschool (école maternelle) and an elementary school.

Gallery

See also
 Communes of the Bas-Rhin department

References

External links

 Commune of Entzheim 

Communes of Bas-Rhin
Bas-Rhin communes articles needing translation from French Wikipedia